The Sandlapper 200 was a NASCAR stock car race held at Columbia Speedway, in Cayce, South Carolina. It was one of two Grand National Series races held at the track between 1951 and 1971; with the contraction of the schedule following R. J. Reynolds' assumption of primary sponsorship of the renamed Winston Cup Series, the race was resanctioned as part of the NASCAR Grand National East Series for its final running in 1972.

The race was traditionally the second of the two Grand National events run at the track; it was not run between 1952 and 1954, and was one of three in 1955 and from 1958 to 1960; in 1972 it was the second of three Grand National East races there. Tim Flock won the inaugural event in 1951; Rex White won the run under the "Sandlapper 200" name in 1962; this gave Chevrolet its 100th NASCAR win. Richard Petty won the final Winston Cup Series race at the track in 1971; a combined race with NASCAR Grand American cars, it was postponed one day due to rain. The lone Grand National East-sanctioned race in 1972 was won by Buddy Baker.

Following the end of the event's time as a NASCAR national touring series event, it continued for several years as a Sportsman Division race; Jack Ingram won the event in 1974, held on Memorial Day.

Past winners

Multiple winners (drivers)

Manufacturer wins

References

Former NASCAR races
 
Recurring sporting events established in 1951